DE14 may refer to:
 Delaware Route 14
 
 DE14, a postcode district in Burton-on-Trent, England; see DE postcode area